Silver acetate is an coordination compound with the empirical formula CH3CO2Ag (or AgC2H3O2). A photosensitive, white, crystalline solid, it is a useful reagent in the laboratory as a source of silver ions lacking an oxidizing anion.

Synthesis and structure
Silver acetate can be synthesized by the reaction of acetic acid and silver carbonate.

2 CH3CO2H + Ag2CO3 → 2 AgO2CCH3 + H2O + CO2
Solid silver acetate precipitates upon concentration of solutions of silver nitrate and sodium acetate.

The structure of silver acetate consists of 8-membered Ag2O4C2 rings formed by a pair of acetate ligands bridging a pair of silver centres.

Reactions
Silver acetate finds use in certain transformations in organic synthesis.

Sulfenamide synthesis
Silver acetate is used to prepare sulfenamides from disulfides and secondary amines:
 R2NH + AgOAc + (RS)2 → R2NSR + AgSR + HOAc

Hydrogenation
A solution of silver acetate in pyridine absorbs hydrogen, producing metallic silver:
2 CH3CO2Ag + H2 → 2 Ag + 2 CH3CO2H

Direct ortho-arylation
Silver acetate is a reagent for direct ortho-arylation (to install two adjacent substituents on an aromatic ring) of benzylamines and N-methylbenzylamines. The reaction is palladium-catalyzed and requires a slight excess of silver acetate. This reaction is shorter than previous ortho-arylation methods.

Oxidative dehalogenation
Silver acetate can be used to convert certain organohalogen compounds into alcohols. It may be used, in spite of its high cost, in instances where a mild and selective reagent is desired.

Woodward cis-hydroxylation
Silver acetate in combination with iodine forms the basis of the Woodward cis-hydroxylation. This reaction selectively converts an alkene into a cis-diol.

Uses
In the health field, silver acetate-containing products have been used in gum, spray, and lozenges to deter smokers from smoking. The silver in these products, when mixed with smoke, creates an unpleasant metallic taste, thus deterring them from smoking. Lozenges containing 2.5 mg of silver acetate showed "modest efficacy" on 500 adult smokers tested over a three-month period. However, over a period of 12 months, prevention failed. In 1974, silver acetate was first introduced in Europe as an over-the-counter smoking-deterrent lozenge (Repaton) and then three years later as a chewing gum (Tabmint).

Silver acetate is also a well known precursor used in printed electronics.  Particularly, complexes of silver acetate have been reported to form particle free "reactive inks" that form traces that approach bulk silver conductivity (within one order of magnitude).

Safety
The LD50 of silver acetate in mice is 36.7 mg/kg. Low doses of silver acetate in mice produced hyper-excitability, ataxia, central nervous system depression, labored breathing, and even death. The U.S. FDA recommends that silver acetate intake be limited to 756 mg over a short period of time; excessive intake may cause argyria.

References

Further reading

Silver compounds
Acetates